Pine Street School is a for-profit co-ed international school with an authorized International Baccalaureate Primary Years Programme for ages 2 through 5th grade. The school opened in September 2014 in New York City in the Financial District neighborhood. Pine Street School opened with a dual language immersion program in Spanish and has since added a Mandarin dual language immersion option.

Pine Street School is organized in four divisions: the nursery program (2-year-olds), Preschool (ages 3 and 4), and Elementary School (Kindergarten through 5th grade).

Leadership team
Pine Street School’s Head of School is Eileen Freely Baker, who previously held leadership positions at Istanbul International Community School, Luanda International School, Global Indo-Asia School and Isikkent School. Baker has led workshops and conducted site visits for the International Baccalaureate Primary Years Programme in Africa, Europe, Middle East and Asia Pacific since 1999. She is the sister of Maureen Freely, a lecturer at the University of Warwick and occasional contributor to The Guardian and The Independent newspapers. Baker and Freely are the daughters of John Freely, an American physicist, teacher, and author of popular travel and history books on Istanbul, Athens, Venice, Turkey, Greece, and the Ottoman Empire.

In 2020, Robert Smith joined the Pine Street Administrative Team.

New York City campus
Pine Street School is located in New York’s Financial District at 25 Pine Street, on the bottom four floors of the building also known as 40 Wall Street, a 71-story neo-gothic skyscraper between Nassau Street and William Street in Manhattan, New York City designed by H. Craig Severance, along with Yasuo Matsui (associate architect), and Shreve & Lamb (consulting architects).  Pine Street School occupies 85,000 square feet (7,896 m2) that was renovated and designed by the architectural firm Perkins Eastman, and Structure Tone (construction management).

Pine Street School is located next door to Federal Hall National Memorial, in a building on Wall Street.  The school faces 28 Liberty Street, formerly known as One Chase Manhattan Plaza. This plaza features Group of Four Trees, a sculpture by Jean Dubuffet.

Pine Street School has formed a partnership with the New York Health and Racquet Club to provide both athletic facilities and experienced, professional instructors. Classes are taught in the New York Health and Racquet Club facilities at 39 Whitehall Street. Pine Street School also utilizes historic area resources to involve, educate and stimulate students, including the South Street Seaport, the Federal Reserve Bank of New York, The Battery, the 9/11 Memorial, Brooklyn Bridge, and Chinatown.

Pine Street School opened with 2 of its planned 11 grades for the 2014-2015 school year, including all grades between nursery and preschool. The Kindergarten, 1st, 2nd, 3rd, 4th and 5th grades were added over the subsequent four years.

Admission
Pine Street School has a rolling admission policy that provides the opportunity for students to apply at any time during the year. The application process includes the completion of the ERB for appropriate grades.
For the 2018-2019 academic year, tuition at Pine Street School will cost an average of $36,200 annually per student.  The school will offer financial aid to the parents of admitted students through School and Student Services which collaborates with the National Association of Independent Schools.

Memberships/Affiliations
The International Baccalaureate Organization 
The National Association of Independent Schools (NAIS)
International Schools Services
Search Associates
Association for the Advancement of International Education
Guild of International Baccalaureate Schools Northeast

References

External links
Official Website

2014 establishments in New York City
Financial District, Manhattan
Educational institutions established in 2014
International schools in the United States
International schools in New York City
Private elementary schools in Manhattan
Private middle schools in Manhattan
Preparatory schools in New York City
International Baccalaureate schools in New York (state)